Li Kuei-hsien (born 1937) is a Taiwanese author and poet. He began writing poems in 1953 upon his graduation from the Taipei Institute of Technology. He is noted for writing extended verse in Taiwanese Hokkien and represents an influential figure in the Taiwanese literature movement. Li's work today appears in multi-volume sets of collected poems published in 2001, 2002, and 2003. His "February 28th Incident Requiem" was set to music in 2008 by composer Fan-Long Ko. Translations of Li's poems have been published in Japan, Korea, Russia, New Zealand, Mongolia, India, the former Yugoslavia, Romania, Greece, Spain, the Netherlands and Canada. Li has also translated poems and edited collections of modern poems from Italy and other European sources.

Li has served as chair of Taiwan's National Culture and Arts Foundation. Since 1976 he has been a member of the International Academy of Poets in England. He founded the Taiwan P.E.N. in 1987 and has served as the organizations president. He has been awarded Korea's  Distinguished Asian Poet award (1994), the Rong-hou Taiwanese Poet Prize (1997), India's Poets International Prize (2000), Taiwan's Lai Ho Literature Prize and Premier Culture Prize (2001), the Michael Madhusadan Poet Award (2002), the Wu San-lien Prize in Literature (2004) and Poet Medal of the Mongolian Cultural Foundation (2005). In 2001 he was nominated for the Nobel Prize in Literature by the International Poets Academy of India.

See also
Taiwanese literature movement
Taiwan localization
Fan-Long Ko, composer

References

Printed program booklet, 2-28 Requiem by Fan-Long Ko. 1 DVD. National Taiwan Normal University, 2008.

Living people
1937 births
Taiwanese male writers
Writers from New Taipei
20th-century Taiwanese poets
20th-century translators
21st-century Taiwanese poets
21st-century translators
Taiwanese translators